Morici is a surname. Notable people with the surname include:

Carlo Morici (born 1974), Italian botanist
Peter Morici (born 1948), American economist

Italian-language surnames